Sangir, Sangihe, Sangi or Sanghir may refer to:

 Sangir, Central Asia, in the Kimek Khanate
 Sangihe Islands (Kepulauan Sangir), an archipelago in Indonesia
 Sangihe Island (Sangihe Besar), the largest of the Sangir Islands
 Sangirese people, native people of the Sangir Islands
 Sangirese language, spoken on the Sangir Islands
 Mohammad Sanghir (or Mohammed Saghir), a former extrajudicial captive in the Guantanamo Bay detention camps

See also
 Sangi (disambiguation)

Language and nationality disambiguation pages